Ritual de lo Habitual is the second studio album by Jane's Addiction, released on August 21, 1990, by Warner Brothers. Co-produced by Dave Jerden, it was the band's final studio album before their initial break-up in 1991. Singles from Ritual de lo Habitual include "Been Caught Stealing" and "Stop!". Ritual de lo Habitual is certified 2× Platinum in the U.S.

In 1990, one month after its release, the album had sold 500,000 units.

Music
The album is divided into halves. Tracks 1 through 5 are hard rock songs unrelated to each other.

Tracks 6 through 9 are in memoriam of singer Perry Farrell's deceased girlfriend Xiola Blue, who died of a heroin overdose in 1987 at the age of 19. "Three Days" and "Then She Did" bear a progressive rock influence, while "Of Course" carries a klezmer influence, with a prominent violin throughout. Eric Avery refused to play bass on "Of Course" out of resentment from being told what to play on other songs. Recording engineer and guitar tech Ronnie S. Champagne, who would later confess that Farrell had a tendency to dictate the other members' parts during the recording of this album, ended up playing bass on the song instead. For his part, Avery would later admit regret at not playing on the track.

"Then She Did" also chronicles Farrell's mother's suicide when he was four years old. "It's probably one of the reasons we were brought together…" remarked guitarist Dave Navarro, whose mother was murdered when he was a teenager. "I have memories of us being onstage together and, before we played 'Then She Did', Perry would grab me and say, 'Let's do this for our moms.' I still get chills when I think about it." "When you have something like that happen…" noted Farrell, "the better thing to do is to try to make some flowers grow out of it."

"Ain't No Right" begins with Farrell singing excerpts from "Sex & Drugs & Rock & Roll" by Ian Dury and the Blockheads against a dub reggae backdrop of a drum machine and synthesized bass, which he eventually slurs into a profanity-laced rant. The intro ends and "Ain't No Right" begins.

Packaging
Two versions of the disc packaging were created: one album featured cover artwork by singer Perry Farrell, related to the song "Three Days" and including male and female nudity; the other cover has been called the "clean cover", and features only black text on a white background, listing the band name, album name, and the text of the First Amendment (the "freedom of speech" amendment, erroneously referred to as "Article 1", which in reality establishes the legislative branch of government) of the U.S. Constitution. The back cover of the "clean cover" also contains the text: Hitler's syphilis-ridden dreams almost came true. How could it happen? By taking control of the media. An entire country was led by a lunatic… We must protect our First Amendment, before sick dreams become law. Nobody made fun of Hitler??! The "clean cover" was created so the CD could be distributed in stores which refused to stock items with represented nudity.

Critical reception

Ritual de lo Habitual was acclaimed by music critics, similar to the band's previous album. "The gigantic swerve and swagger of 'Stop', the Chili Pepperish taunts of 'Ain't No Right', 'Of Course's raga rocking and, above all, the epic 'Three Days', where guitarist David Navarro gets to pile the layers shoulder high, prove to be the stuff of true compulsion," wrote Peter Kane in Q. "Enigmatic, audacious and unpredictable to the last."

"It all makes you realise how few bands actually bother to try and be any good, to play stuff that's inspirational," enthused Andrew Perry in a retrospective review for Select. The same magazine later listed Ritual as the fifth best album of the '90s: "Nevermind would never have been possible without it. And, along the way, they ushered in the Led Zep revival."

The album was voted the 24th best of 1990 in The Village Voices Pazz & Jop, an annual poll of American critics nationwide. Robert Christgau, the poll's supervisor, remained unimpressed by the album, dismissing it as "junk syncretism (kitchen-sink eclecticism? styleless mish-mash?)".

Other musicians have spoken highly of the album. "I can spot traces of other people on this album, us included," remarked hard rock vocalist Alice Cooper in 1994, "but that's all they are: traces. They were a really original band. This is their peak album, where they really went out on a limb. Sometimes I get so caught up in these songs, I can actually feel the band pushing themselves to their limits. Sometimes I can't believe how strong it is. I wonder if this will have the same effect on some kid as Chuck Berry had on me ..."

In 2003, the album was ranked number 453 on Rolling Stone magazine's list of the 500 greatest albums of all time.  The album was also included in the book 1001 Albums You Must Hear Before You Die.

In 2019, a book about the album, "El Ritual de Jane's Addiction", was released by Argentinian journalist Fabrizio Pedrotti. It tells the story with collaborations from the band, producers and other artists from that era. Farrell and Dream Theater drummer Mike Portnoy wrote the foreword for it.

Track listing

Personnel
Jane's Addiction
Perry Farrell – lead vocals, piano ("Of Course"), guitar ("Three Days")
Dave Navarro – guitar
Eric Avery – bass guitar
Stephen Perkins – drums

Additional musicians
Charlie Bisharat – violin ("Of Course"), electric violin ("Then She Did ...")
Ronnie S. Champagne – bass ("Of Course")
John Philip Shenale – strings ("Then She Did ...")
Geoff Stradling – piano ("Obvious", "Then She Did ...")
Cindy Lair – spoken word ("Stop!")
 
Other personnel
Herman Agopain – assistant
Victor Bracke – photography
Kim Champagne – advisor
Ronnie S. Champagne – engineering, guitar technician
Chris Edwards – assistant
Perry Farrell – artwork, production
Ross Garfield – drum technician
Dave Jerden – production
Bob Lacivita – engineering
Tom Recchion – advisor
Eddy Schreyer – mastering

Charts

Weekly charts

Year-end charts

Certifications

References

External links
 Ritual de lo Habitual at Discogs
 Album Review at Cokemachineglow
 Album Review at Music Emissions

1990 albums
Jane's Addiction albums
Albums produced by Dave Jerden
Warner Records albums
Obscenity controversies in music